Sálin hans Jóns míns sometimes abbreviated to just Sálin was an Icelandic rock band established in Reykjavík by Guðmundur Jónsson, Jón Ólafsson and Stefán Hilmarsson. Soon Rafn Jónsson and Harald Þorsteinsson joined for their inaugural year. The band held its first concert in March 1988 considered the year of establishment. In 1989, Rafn Jónsson and Harald Þorsteinsson were replaced by Friðrik Sturluson and Jens Hansson as permanent members.

The name is based on Icelandic popular legend of the same name Sálin hans Jóns míns written by Icelandic poet Davíð Stefánsson.

Members
Stefán Hilmarsson - vocals
Guðmundur Jónsson - guitar
Friðrik Sturluson - bass
Jens Hansson - Keyboards, saxophone
Jóhann Hjörleifsson - drums

Discography

Albums
1988: Syngjandi sveittir
1989: Hvar er draumurinn?
1991: Sálin hans Jóns míns
1992: Garg
1992: Þessi þungu högg
1995: Sól um nótt
1998: Gullna hliðið
1999: 12. ágúst '99
2000: Annar máni
2001: Logandi ljós
2003: Vatnið
2005: Undir þínum áhrifum
2006: Sálin og Gospel
2008: Arg
2010: Upp og niður stigann
2013: Glamr

solo by Stefán Hilmarsson
1993: Lif
1996: Eins og er...
2008: Ein handa þér
2009: Húm (Söngvar um ástina og lífið)

Singles
(Selective)
"Okkar nótt"
"Á Nýjum Stað"
"Sól ég hef sögu að segja þér"
"Gefðu mér bros (Þú um það ;-)" (2013)
"Ferðamenn" (2013)

References

Icelandic rock music groups
Musical groups established in 1988
1988 establishments in Iceland
Musical groups from Reykjavík